Over My Dead Body is a 1942 American film directed by Malcolm St. Clair.

Plot

Cast
 Milton Berle as Jason Cordry
 Mary Beth Hughes as Patricia Cordry
 Reginald Denny as Richard 'Dick' Brenner
 Frank Orth as Detective
 William B. Davidson as Crole
 Wonderful Smith as Wonderful
 Pat O'Malley as Petie Stuyvesant
 Emory Parnell as Police Capt. Grady

References

External links 
 

1942 films
American comedy mystery films
1940s comedy mystery films
20th Century Fox films
Films scored by Cyril J. Mockridge
Films scored by Emil Newman
American black-and-white films
Films directed by Malcolm St. Clair
1940s English-language films
1940s American films